

Big Ten conference rivalry games

|}

Big Ten non-conference rivalry games

|}

References 

Rivalry